The 1996 Manly Warringah Sea Eagles season was the 50th in the club's history since their entry into the then New South Wales Rugby Football League premiership in 1947.

The 1996 Sea Eagles were coached by triple Manly premiership player and 1987 Premiership winning coach Bob Fulton. Captaining the side was local junior, halfback Geoff Toovey. The club competed in the Australian Rugby League's 1996 Premiership season and played its home games at the 27,000 capacity Brookvale Oval.

Ladder

Regular season

Finals

Qualifying Final

Preliminary Final

Grand Final

1st half
In the 5th minute, Manly centre Craig Innes won the chase and scored after a grubber kick by his skipper Geoff Toovey. Matthew Ridge converted from the sideline for 6–0. The Dragons played on after being awarded a penalty in front of the posts in the 8th minute but failed to score. At the 15-minute mark Saints' halfback Noel Goldthorpe conceded a penalty right in front of their goalpost after committing a head high tackle on Manly's Daniel Gartner. Ridge took the kick, extending the lead to 8–0. St. George sent in forward replacements Lance Thompson and David Barnhill for Scott Gourley and Kevin Campion (head cut). For Manly, Tierney came off the interchange bench to replace Gillespie. Up until the 19th minute mark when Manly veteran five-eighth Cliff Lyons took the field, their coach Bob Fulton was using six running forwards with Toovey as dummy half.

After turning down a relatively easy penalty goal chance not long after Manly's opening try, the Dragons' first points came in the 37th minute when Wayne Bartrim kicked a penalty awarded when Manly forward Cunningham stripped the ball. From the ensuing kick-off just before half-time came the game's controversial moment and a hotly disputed try. Ridge made a spectacular short kick-off and regathered, catching the Dragons unaware. St George hooker Nathan Brown appeared to tackle Ridge albeit one-handedly and by the collar. Ridge got up and ran when Brown was expecting him to stop and play the ball. Referee David Manson ruled that Brown did not complete the tackle. Ridge was eventually tackled just a few metres from the line. From dummy-half Nik Kosef then passed the ball to Steve Menzies who stormed his way through Saints' defense of Thompson, Raper, Goldthorpe and Bartrim to score next to the posts, giving Ridge an easy conversion kick. The controversial ruling by referee Manson gave Manly a 14–2 half time lead and broke Saints' resolve. In the process of scoring Menzies injured his groin/hamstring and although he returned for the second half, he was unable to run and was eventually replaced by coach Fulton.

2nd half
In the 53rd minute Manly's Danny Moore scored a try from a Terry Hill pass after Hill drew Saints defenders, Adrian Brunker and Nick Zisti. With Ridge off the field after being concussed in a tackle, Innes converted from 5m off the sideline for the Sea-Eagles to take a 20–2 lead. Five minutes later Dragons' winger Zisti scored a try from a Bartrim cut-out pass. Bartrim then converted from the sideline for a final scoreline of 20–8. The final twenty minutes were scoreless with two field goal attempts from Ridge charged down by Dragons' defenders.

Player statistics
Note: Games and (sub) show total games played, e.g. 1 (1) is 2 games played.

Representative Players

International
 Australia – Mark Carroll, Daniel Gartner, Terry Hill, Nik Kosef, Steve Menzies, Geoff Toovey
 New Zealand – Matthew Ridge

State

 New South Wales – Steve Menzies, Geoff Toovey
 Queensland – Owen Cunningham

City vs Country
 City Origin – Mark Carroll, Terry Hill, Steve Menzies, Geoff Toovey

References

External links
Manly Warringah Sea Eagles official website
National Rugby League official website

Manly Warringah Sea Eagles seasons
Manly-Warringah Sea Eagles season
Manly-Warringah Sea Eagles season